DCA may refer to:

Computers 
 Document Content Architecture, an IBM document standard
 Dynamic Channel Allocation/Assignment, in wireless networks
 DTS Coherent Acoustics in DTS (sound system)

Military 
 Defence Cyber Agency, a tri-service command of the Indian Armed Forces
 Defense Communications Agency, former name of US Defense Information Systems Agency
 Defensive counter air (Défense contre les aéronefs), French term for air defense
 Deputy Commandant for Aviation, principal advisor on all aviation matters in the United States Marine Corps
 Dual-capable aircraft, used in nuclear sharing

Organizations 
 California Department of Consumer Affairs
 Department for Constitutional Affairs of the UK government, 2003-2007
 DCA Design
 Department of Civil Aviation (Australia)
 Department of Civil Aviation (Thailand)
 Digital Communications Associates, US company
 Diyanet Center of America, Lanham, Maryland
 Drum Corps Associates, a governing body of drum corps in North America
 Dundee Contemporary Arts,  Scotland
 Namibia Directorate of Civil Aviation
 Christian Democracy for the Autonomies, a former political party in Italy

Science and technology 
 Detrended correspondence analysis, a statistical technique
 Dichloroacetic acid / dichloroacetate, an organic acid
 Dichloroethanes, organic solvents
 Digitally-controlled amplifier
 Direct coupling analysis, a method for analyzing sequence data in computational biology
 Directional component analysis, a multivariate statistical technique used in the atmospheric sciences

Television, film, and music 
 Distributors Corporation of America, American film distribution company (1952-1959)

Transportation 
 Ronald Reagan Washington National Airport, Arlington County, Virginia, US, IATA code
 Dutch Caribbean Airlines, former Netherlands Antilles airline

Other uses 
 Direct corporate access, part of UK Faster Payments Service
 Dollar cost averaging, an investment strategy
 Disney California Adventure, Anaheim, California, US
 Debt Collection Agency, companies specialized in pursuing payments of debts